Raffaele Fiorini (15 July 1828 – 18 October 1898), was an influential Italian violin maker.

Innovator, personality and pioneer of the great rebirth of contemporary Bolognese violinmaking, Fiorini was born at Musiano di Pian di Macina di Pianoro near Bologna.
He spent his early years in Bazzano, where he learned the first elements of the craft while working with his father at the 'Mulino della Sega'.
A famous violin player and teacher, Professor Verardi, induced him to start the 'Bolognese adventure' and to open a workshop in the Palazzo Pepoli, not far from the Liceo Musicale, in Bologna downtown.
Fiorini quickly achieved a reputation in his new environment and was able to attract apprentices of great talent, including his son Giuseppe.
Raffaele won a silver medal with praise during the International Music Exhibit of Arezzo in 1882, and a silver medal during the Torino Exhibition in 1884; he received also great acclaim for his restoration work.

Biography

Up to the first half of the nineteenth century, violin making in Italy had come to a standstill, but during the second half of the century, Raffaele Fiorini gave new impulse to it.

Thanks to him, born in Musiano di Pianoro, the luthier's ancient Art was brought back to a new life.

He took by himself several apprentices who, in their turn, continued his tradition with good success during the following century. One can say that today any Bolognese luthier has his roots in this school.

These are among the best bowed instrument makers of the 20th century in Italy: 
Augusto Pollastri, first of this renowned luthier family, started his career as an apprentice in Raffaele Fiorini's studio. Augusto showed a remarkable artistic gift and took the firm's responsibility upon himself when Raffaele, towards the end of his life, could not manage the workshop. After Raffaele Fiorini's death Augusto Pollastri managed one of the most important luthier's Atelier in Bologna for thirty years, helped also by his brother Gaetano. Augusto's total production was not very high in number, yet it was of an astounding quality and class. Pollastri's instruments are today considered legendary and the model developed by him is one on the most copied in the world, besides the classical ones. In fact the number of fake instruments and imitations one could come across is much greater than the number of originals.

Gaetano, Augusto's brother, continued after his death, reaching very good results too.

Brothers Candi (Oreste & Cesare) worked in Genoa, yet they are considered Raffaele Fiorini's pupils in all respects; above all, Cesare who gained distinguished international fame not only in bowed instrument making but also in plucked instruments, refined inlaying and carving.

Armando Monterumici was another Bolognese artist who apprenticed in the same workshop during the last years of the 19th century and who deserves to be known better; in fact his production is today quite rare to find.

Giuseppe, son of Raffaele, quickly achieved a solid reputation and today he is certainly considered one of the most important Italian violin makers.

Cremona too should be grateful to this scholar who, after forty years of essays, bought the rest of Stradivari's workshop (shapes, tools, original drawings, models) and donated them upon the city, in order to form a lutherie school which could bring again Italy at the top of the bowed instrument making world.

Ansaldo Poggi was Giuseppe Fiorini's favourite pupil. His instruments are among the most sought-after and expensive instruments today on the market. Certainly this is also due to the school he had with Fiorini, to which Poggi, when alive, has always been proud to have been part of. 

Carlo Carletti of Bologna would have been one of Fiorini's last pupils. Fiorini mentored Carletti during the last years of his life. Carletti's instruments are well known for its rich sound and precise workmanship. Following Fiorini's death, Carletti formed a strong bond with Ettore Soffritti, Augusto Pollastri and Giuseppe Fiorini.

Last but not least, Otello Bignami, teacher of the greatest part of the professional luthiers now living and working in Bologna; his memory is still very vivid among them who knew him.

Bibliography
Il Suono di Bologna, Da Raffaele Fiorini ai grandi maestri del Novecento". Catalogo della Mostra nella chiesa di San Giorgio in Poggiale, Bologna 2002, 
A Misura d'Uomo, Venezia 1985, 
Paradigmi. Forme nell'Artigianato, Bologna 1988 and 1989
Daniele Benati - Pierluigi Giordani, Stanze bolognesi - La Collezione Lauro, Bologna 1994
Artemio Versari, "Liuteria moderna in Emilia Romagna" 2002
Artemio Versari, "La grande liuteria italiana" 2009
Eric Blot, Un secolo di Liuteria Italiana 1860-1960 - A century of Italian Violin Making - Emilia e Romagna I, Cremona 1994 and 2003, 
Marlin Brinser, Dictionary of 20th Century Italian Violin Makers, 1978 
The Strad, January 1984, Bologna - A living tradition of Violin Making
 
 
Walter Hamma, Meister Italienischer Geigenbaukunst, Wilhelmshaven 1993,

References

http://www.florenusedizioni.com/ilsuono.htm

http://www.artigianatoartistico.it/fiera_maestriliutai.htm#obignami

https://web.archive.org/web/20110726170546/http://www.ideapianoro.org/Giornale/2003/02/305.htm

Living Museum

Discover the history of the Bolognese School  Bolognese Violin Makers

'Up to the first half of the nineteenth century, Violin Making in Italy was in a standstill cycle; yet, during the second half of the century, Raffaele Fiorini :it:Fiorini Raffaele gave new impulse to it.
Thanks to him, born in Musiano di Pianoro, the luthier's ancient Art was brought back to a new life.' - History

People from Bologna
Italian luthiers
1828 births
1898 deaths
19th-century Italian musicians